The 2022–23 La Salle Explorers men's basketball team represented La Salle University during the 2022–23 NCAA Division I men's basketball season. The Explorers, led by first-year head coach Fran Dunphy, played their home games at Tom Gola Arena in Philadelphia, Pennsylvania as members of the Atlantic 10 Conference.

Previous season 
The Explorers finished the 2021–22 season 11–19, 5–13 in A-10 play to finish in a tie for 12th place. As the No. 12 seed in the A-10 tournament, they defeated Saint Joseph's in the first round before losing to Saint Louis in the second round.

On March 21, 2022, the school fired head coach Ashley Howard. On April 5, the school announced former Penn and Temple head coach, Fran Dunphy, would be the team's new head coach.

Offseason

Departures

Incoming Transfers

2022 recruiting class

Roster

Schedule and results

|-
!colspan=9 style=| Non-conference regular season

|-
!colspan=9 style=|Atlantic 10 regular season

|-
!colspan=9 style=| Atlantic 10 tournament

Source

References

La Salle Explorers men's basketball seasons
La Salle
La Salle
La Salle